Al-Shuwayhid (also spelled al-Shuwaihed) is a village in northern Syria located west of Homs in the Homs Governorate. According to the Syria Central Bureau of Statistics, al-Shuwayhid had a population of 654 in the 2004 census. Its inhabitants are predominantly Sunni Muslims.

References

Populated places in Talkalakh District